Malloy v. South Carolina, was a case in which the Supreme Court of the United States held that retroactively changing the execution method does not violate the Ex post facto clause.

See also 

 List of United States Supreme Court decisions on capital punishment

References

United States Supreme Court cases
1915 in United States case law